Alexander Graham Spiers (? – 24 December 1847) was a Scottish MP in the Parliament of the United Kingdom for the Scottish constituency of Paisley.

Biography
Spiers was born the second son of Peter Spiers of Culcreuch.

Alexander Spiers is described in a Who's Who of Scottish MPs as an advocate, perhaps starting from 8 July 1820. The History of Parliament Online states his formative occupation to have been an army officer.

He was elected MP for Paisley in the January 1835 United Kingdom general election, standing in the Whig interest, but resigned by applying to be steward of the Chiltern Hundreds, effective 17 March 1836. Hansard records no contributions to debates from Spiers.

Spiers died on 24 December 1847.

References

External links
 

1847 deaths
Members of the Parliament of the United Kingdom for Scottish constituencies
Members of the Parliament of the United Kingdom for Paisley constituencies
UK MPs 1835–1837